Planet Sub (or Yello Sub) is a growing fast food restaurant based in Kansas City, Missouri. They are expanding with emphasis on franchising the brand in the United States. As of 2016, they have 14 corporate stores and 28 franchise locations, with 26 additional franchise units in development. Open markets include: Kansas City, Topeka, Wichita, Lawrence, Warrensburg, Des Moines, St. Louis, Phoenix, Tucson, Austin, Oklahoma City, Owasso (Tulsa), Dallas, San Antonio, Omaha, and Emporia.

Planet Sub is known for their bread made from scratch in each of their locations and their playing card system in which customers are given a unique playing card to identify their sandwich when it is finished being baked. Most products are made from scratch in each location and all meats and cheeses are sliced daily. They also serve made-to-order salads, romaine lettuce wraps, soups, and cookies.

History 
The original Yello Sub sandwich store (from which Planet Sub was born) was opened in Lawrence, Kansas in 1979. The Planet Sub franchise opened its first store in Overland Park, Kansas in 1998. The company has held true to several elements of their roots including fresh sliced meats, veggies, and cheeses, home-made sauces and bread, and have expanded their menu to over 45 unique sandwich choices.

References

External links
 

Companies based in Kansas City, Missouri
Restaurants in Kansas
Economy of the Midwestern United States
Regional restaurant chains in the United States
Fast-food chains of the United States
Restaurants established in 1979
Submarine sandwich restaurants
Fast-food franchises
1979 establishments in Kansas